The Roman Catholic Diocese of Ciudad Guayana is a diocese located in the city of Ciudad Guayana in the Ecclesiastical province of Ciudad Bolívar in Venezuela.

History
On 20 August 1979 Blessed John Paul II established the Diocese of Ciudad Guayana from the Metropolitan Archdiocese of Ciudad Bolívar.

Bishops

Ordinaries
Medardo Luis Luzardo Romero (20 August 1979 – 26 May 1986) Appointed, Archbishop of Ciudad Bolívar
José de Jesús Nuñez Viloria (13 January 1987 – 21 July 1990)
Ubaldo Ramón Santana Sequera, F.M.I. (2 May 1991 – 11 November 2000) Appointed, Archbishop of Maracaibo
Mariano José Parra Sandoval (10 July 2001 – 25 October 2016) Appointed, Archbishop of Coro
Helizandro Emiro Terán Bermúdez, O.S.A. (29 July 2017 – 19 March 2022)

Other priests of this diocese who became bishops
Ángel Francisco Caraballo Fermín, appointed Auxiliary Bishop of Maracaibo in 2012
Juan Carlos Bravo Salazar, appointed Bishop of Acarigua-Araure in 2015

See also
Roman Catholicism in Venezuela

References

Sources
 GCatholic.org
 Catholic Hierarchy 
 Diocese Website

Roman Catholic dioceses in Venezuela
Roman Catholic Ecclesiastical Province of Ciudad Bolívar
Christian organizations established in 1979
Roman Catholic dioceses and prelatures established in the 20th century
1979 establishments in Venezuela
Ciudad Guayana